The educational institutions of Chandigarh include several types of universities and colleges located in the Chandigarh union territory of India.

Universities 
In Chandigarh there is one state university, one private university and one deemed university.

Colleges 
 Chandigarh College of Architecture
 Chandigarh College of Engineering and Technology
 DAV College
 Goswami Ganesh Dutta Sanatan Dharma College
 Government College of Art
 Government College of Commerce and Business Administration
 Government College of Education, Chandigarh
 Government Medical College and Hospital
 Indo Global Colleges 
 Institute of Microbial Technology

 Alliance Française de Chandigarh
 Brahmrishi Yoga Training College
 Dev Samaj College of Education
 Dev Samaj College for Women
 Dr. Ambedkar Institute of Hotel Management, Catering and Nutrition
 Dr. Harvansh Singh Judge Institute of Dental Sciences & Hospital
 Government College for Girls, Chandigarh
 Government College of Yoga Education and Health
 Government Home Science College
 Government Rehabilitation Institute for Intellectual Disabilities 
 Guru Gobind Singh College for Women
 Homoepathic Medical College & Hospital
 Indian Institute of Fashion and Design - (IIFD)
 Indo-Swiss Training Centre
 Institute for the Blind, Chandigarh
 Mehr Chand Mahajan DAV College for Women
 National Institute of Technical Teachers Training & Research
 Post Graduate Government College – 11
 Post Graduate Government College – 46
 Post Graduate Government College for Girls
 Regional Institute of English
 Shri Dhanwantri Ayurvedic College & Hospital
 UEI Global

See also
List of educational institutions in Mohali
List of schools in India

References 

 
Chandigarh
Universities and colleges in Chandigarh
Chandigarh-related lists